The 2009–10 Stanford Cardinal women's basketball team represented Stanford University in the 2009–10 NCAA Division I women's basketball season. The Cardinal, coached by Tara VanDerveer. and a member of the Pacific-10 Conference, won the conference's regular-season and tournament titles, and was the runner-up at the NCAA championship.

Offseason
 May 17: All five Stanford women's basketball players invited to the USA Basketball trials camps were named finalists for their respective teams. Freshmen Sarah Boothe and Nnemkadi Ogwumike were among the 14 finalists named for the USA Women's U19 World Championship Team. Junior Jayne Appel and sophomores Kayla Pedersen and Jeanette Pohlen were among the 14 finalists named for the 2009 USA Women's World University Games Team.
Appel, Pedersen and Pohlen will return to Colorado Springs, Colo. on June 18 for training camp. The camp will last until the team's departure on June 25 for the 2009 World University Games. The 12-woman roster will be named prior to the team's departure for the Games, which are set to take place from July 1–11 in Belgrade, Serbia.
Boothe and Ogwumike will return to Colorado Springs for training camp on July 9, where the final 12-woman roster for the U19 World Championship will be determined. The 2009 FIBA U19 World Championship is set to take place from July 23–August 2 in Bangkok, Thailand.
July 30: The Women's Basketball Coaches Association (WBCA), on behalf of the Wade Coalition, announced the 2009–2010 preseason "Wade Watch" list for The State Farm Wade Trophy Division I Player of the Year. Three players from the Cardinal, Jayne Appel, Kayla Pederson and Jeannette Pohlen, have been named to the 2009–10 preseason "Wade Watch" list, which is made up of top NCAA Division I student-athletes who best embody the spirit of Lily Margaret Wade. This is based on the following criteria: game and season statistics, leadership, character, effect on their team and overall playing ability.
August 21: The 2009–10 preseason candidates list for the Women's Wooden Award was released, naming 31 student athletes. Jayne Appel and Jeanette Pohlen from Stanford were two of the candidates.

Regular season
 Jayne Appel became the leading rebounder in Pac-10 history on 27 February 2010, surpassing Lisa Leslie's record of 1,214 career rebounds.

Schedule

|-
!colspan=7| Pre-Season Schedule

|-
!colspan=7| Non-conference regular season Schedule

|-
!colspan=7| Pacific-10 Conference regular season Schedule

Postseason

Pac-10 Basketball Tournament

|-
!colspan=7| Pacific-10 Conference tournament
|-

NCAA basketball tournament

|-
!colspan=7| NCAA tournament

Awards and honors

Team players drafted into the WNBA

See also
2009–10 NCAA Division I women's basketball season

References

External links
Official Site

Stanford Cardinal women's basketball seasons
Stanford
NCAA Division I women's basketball tournament Final Four seasons
Stanford